Esperanto Island is the largest and northwesternmost island in the Zed group off the north coast of Varna Peninsula on Livingston Island in the South Shetland Islands, Antarctica. The area was visited by early 19th century sealers.

The island is named after the constructed international language Esperanto.

Location
British mapping in 1968, Chilean in 1971, Argentine in 1980, Bulgarian in 2005 and 2009.

See also 
 Composite Antarctic Gazetteer
 List of Antarctic islands south of 60° S
 SCAR
 Territorial claims in Antarctica

References

 Bulgarian Antarctic Gazetteer. Antarctic Place-names Commission. (details in Bulgarian, basic data in English)

External links
 Esperanto Island. SCAR Composite Antarctic Gazetteer.
 Bulgarian Antarctic Gazetteer. Antarctic Place-names Commission. (details in Bulgarian, basic data in English)

External links
 Esperanto Island. Copernix satellite image

Islands of Livingston Island
Bulgaria and the Antarctic